Adheritus, born in Greece, became Bishop of Ravenna and successor of Saint Apollinaris. His remains are venerated in the Benedictine Basilica of Sant'Apollinare in Classe near Ravenna, Italy.

Notes

Saints from Roman Greece
2nd-century Christian saints
2nd-century Italian bishops
Bishops of Ravenna